Nebria spatulata is a species of brownish-black coloured ground beetle in the Nebriinae subfamily that is endemic to the US state of California.

References

spatulata
Beetles described in 1925
Beetles of North America
Endemic fauna of California
Fauna without expected TNC conservation status